Acrocercops strophala is a moth of the family Gracillariidae. It is commonly found in India (Assam, Maharashtra, Meghalaya), Indonesia (Java), Samoa, Guadalcanal and Sri Lanka.

The larvae feed on Glochidion lanceolarium. They mine the leaves of their host plant. The mine has the form of a blotch under the upper cuticle of the leaf. There may be as many as six blotches in a single leaf.

References

strophala
Moths described in 1908
Moths of Asia